Dümmer See is a lake in Nordwestmecklenburg and Ludwigslust-Parchim, Mecklenburg-Vorpommern, Germany. At an elevation of 45.5 m, its surface area is 1.59 km².

External links 

 

Lakes of Mecklenburg-Western Pomerania
LDümmer See